Rueglio is a comune (municipality) in the Metropolitan City of Turin in the Italian region Piedmont, located about  north of Turin.

Rueglio borders the following municipalities: Castellamonte, Val di Chy, Valchiusa, Issiglio, Castelnuovo Nigra, and Vistrorio.

References

Cities and towns in Piedmont